There are two ships of the French navy that have borne the name Modeste:
 , captured in 1759 and taken into service as HMS Modeste. She was broken up in August 1800.
She was broken up in June 1814.

French Navy ship names